Appavaram is a village in the Tiruvallur district of Tamil Nadu, India. It is located in the Gummidipoondi taluk.

This village is located near the Rakkampalayam lake, and the Eucalyptus lake of Pattupalli. It is located north of Sennavaram and east of Pattupalli.

Demographics 

According to the 2011 census of India, Appavaram has 247 households. The effective literacy rate (i.e. the literacy rate of population excluding children aged 6 and below) is 61.55%.

References 

Villages in Gummidipoondi taluk